Quercus brandisiana is a species of oak native to Bangladesh, Myanmar, Thailand and Laos. It is in the subgenus Cerris, section Cyclobalanopsis. In upland forests it is often the dominant species.

References

brandisiana
Plants described in 1873